Kate Emma Haywood (born 1 April 1987) is an English former elite swimmer who competed for Great Britain in the Olympics, FINA world championships, and European championships, and represented England in the Commonwealth Games.  She competed predominantly as a breaststroke swimmer.  She was the youngest swimmer to represent England in the Commonwealth Games when she qualified for the 2002 Commonwealth Games in Manchester, where she won a bronze medal in the 4×100-metre medley relay.  She retired from competitive swimming following the 2012 Summer Olympics.

Career summary
Despite missing out on qualification for the British swim squad at the 2004 Summer Olympics in Athens, Haywood qualified for the 2006 Commonwealth Games in Melbourne, Australia, where she won a silver medal in the 4×100-metre medley relay.

She won a joint silver medal (with Sarah Katoulis of Australia) in the 50-metre breaststroke at the 2008 World Short Course Championships. She competed at the 2008 Olympic Games in Beijing, finishing in 4th place in the British 4×100-metre medley relay team, and reaching the semi-finals in the 100-metre breaststroke. She was forced to miss the 2009 Swimming World Championships in Rome due to a hip injury.

Haywood won the bronze medal in the 50- and 100-metre breaststroke at the 2010 Commonwealth Games in Delhi, India.

After retirement from swimming, Kate has set up a successful personal training business called Straightline Fitness. She consults to people and businesses, helping them achieve their fitness goals.

Personal life
Haywood won the BBC Young Sports Personality of the Year award in 2003.

From 2010, Haywood lived and trained in Melbourne, Australia, under the guidance of Rohan Taylor.

Her great-grandfather was Warneford Cresswell, former Everton and England footballer.

Personal bests and records held

References
Kate's BBC award shock!, BBC News Online.

External links
Kate Haywood Official Website
Straightline Fitness personal training and corporate fitness
British Swimming athlete profile
British Olympic Association athlete profile
Melbourne 2006 Commonwealth Games profile. Accessed 16 May 2006.

English female swimmers
Alumni of Loughborough University
Sportspeople from Grimsby
1987 births
Living people
Olympic swimmers of Great Britain
Commonwealth Games silver medallists for England
Commonwealth Games bronze medallists for England
Swimmers at the 2002 Commonwealth Games
Swimmers at the 2006 Commonwealth Games
Swimmers at the 2010 Commonwealth Games
Swimmers at the 2008 Summer Olympics
Swimmers at the 2012 Summer Olympics
Medalists at the FINA World Swimming Championships (25 m)
European Aquatics Championships medalists in swimming
Commonwealth Games medallists in swimming
Female breaststroke swimmers
Medallists at the 2002 Commonwealth Games
Medallists at the 2006 Commonwealth Games
Medallists at the 2010 Commonwealth Games